The Carnegie Library in Parsons, Kansas is a building from 1909. The Carnegie library was listed on the National Register of Historic Places in 1976.

The Parsons Public Library moved out to a larger facility in 1977.

The building is now home to the Carnegie Arts Center, which hosts art shows and community events.

References

Library buildings completed in 1909
Libraries on the National Register of Historic Places in Kansas
Beaux-Arts architecture in Kansas
Buildings and structures in Labette County, Kansas
Carnegie libraries in Kansas
Tourist attractions in Labette County, Kansas
National Register of Historic Places in Labette County, Kansas